Matti Steinmann (born 8 January 1995) is a Finnish-German professional footballer who last played as a midfielder for Brisbane Roar in the A-League.

Club career

Hamburger SV
Steinmann is a youth exponent from Hamburger SV. He made his Bundesliga debut at 20 September 2014 against Bayern Munich. He replaced Nicolai Müller after 87 minutes in a 0–0 home draw.

Loan to Vendsyssel FF
Steinmann was loaned out to Danish Superliga club Vendsyssel FF on 31 January 2019 for the rest of the season.

Wellington Phoenix
In August 2019, Steinmann joined A-League club Wellington Phoenix on a one-year contract.

East Bengal
On 18 September 2020, Steinmann joined Indian Super League club East Bengal. He scored his first goal on 26 December against Chennaiyin FC.

Brisbane Roar
In June 2021, Steinmann returned to Australia, signing with Brisbane Roar. In December 2022, he was released by the club after 17 appearances.

Career statistics

Club

References

External links
 kicker profile 
 

1995 births
Living people
German people of Finnish descent
German footballers
Association football midfielders
Bundesliga players
2. Bundesliga players
3. Liga players
Regionalliga players
Danish Superliga players
Indian Super League players
A-League Men players
Hamburger SV players
Hamburger SV II players
Chemnitzer FC players
1. FSV Mainz 05 II players
Vendsyssel FF players
Wellington Phoenix FC players
Germany youth international footballers
Footballers from Hamburg
German expatriate sportspeople in India
Expatriate men's footballers in Denmark
Expatriate soccer players in Australia
Expatriate footballers in India